Clenia is an extinct genus of marsupials from the Oligocene and Miocene of South America. They are relatives of the living monito del monte (colocolo).

Description
Two species are known. The type species is Clenia minuscula from the Early Miocene of Argentina. The other is Clenia brevis from the Oligocene of Argentina. It had more robust molars than C. minuscula.

References

Microbiotheriidae
Prehistoric marsupial genera
Oligocene mammals of South America
Miocene mammals of South America
Golfo San Jorge Basin
Sarmiento Formation